Nussbaum Riegel is a riegel or rock-bar across Taylor Valley in Victoria Land, extending from the vicinity of Sollas Glacier toward Lake Chad. Charted and named by the British Antarctic Expedition under Scott, 1910–13.

Ridges of Victoria Land
McMurdo Dry Valleys